Changchun Town is a suburban town in Ziyang District of Yiyang, Hunan, China. The town is bordered to the southwest by Yingfengqiao Town, to the east by Zhangjiazhai Township, and to the north by Bailuqiao Town and Yanzhi Subdistrict.

Geography
Zi River, known as "Mother River", flows directly through the town.

Huangjia Lake, situated in the north of the town, is very popular for boating, fishing and camping and is home to many residents from other areas of the province during the summer months.

Economy
Pig, Vegetable, Flower, Aquatic Products and tourism are main industries in the town.

Transportation

Expressway
The G5513 Changsha-Zhangjiajie Expressway, which connects Zhangjiajie and Changsha, runs northwest to southeast through the town.

The Yiyang-Yuanjiang Expressway, runs north through Yanzhi Subdistrict and Qionghu Subdistrict to Yuanjiang City, and runs south to Ziyang District of Yiyang City.

Attractions
The Yunmeng Fangzhou Water Park is a famous scenic spot in the town.

Gallery

References

Towns of Yiyang